This is a list of Women's National Basketball Association players by total career regular season turnovers recorded.

All statistics are up to date as of September 13, 2020.

Notes

External links
WNBA Career Leaders and Records for Turnovers | Basketball-Reference.com - updated daily

Lists of Women's National Basketball Association players
Women's National Basketball Association statistics